Bun Kebab is a sandwich native to Pakistan, but now available all over the Indian subcontinent. Bun kebabs are a signature in Pakistani metro cities like Karachi and Lahore, but they can be found all over Pakistan. In India, it is eaten as a regular street food, specifically, in the Indian cities of Bhopal, Lucknow, and Hyderabad; it is especially popular with Indian Muslims, the dish is eaten late-night during Ramadan.
Bun kebabs are usually sold from roadside stalls, side street vendors, and fast food restaurants. They are also commonly known as anday wala burger. A ‘fried’ version of the bun kebab is popular in Lahore, known as ‘bun plaster’ due to copious amounts of butter and super tender or paste-like kebab mixture used in it. Bun kebabs are usually eaten as a main course or snack.

Ingredients
A bun kebab consists of a shallow-fried spicy patty, onions, and chutney. The chutney is made up from tamarind (imli), salt, cumin powder, whole red chillies, and/or raita in a bun. The bun is grilled on the pan.

Bun kebab patties are typically composed of ground beef or mutton, ground lentils, powdered cumin seeds, and an egg batter. Although they can be vegetarian. The patties are fried in ghee or oil. A bun kebab can also be served with a fried egg or omelette and topped with tomatoes, cucumbers, or onions.

Variations
The patty can be made of chicken, beef, mutton, potato (aloo wala), egg (anday wala), or lentil (daal). The beef and egg recipe is the most popular, especially among street vendors.

See also

 Indian cuisine
 Awadhi cuisine
 Hyderabadi cuisine
 Pakistani cuisine
 Fastfood
 Kebab
 List of sandwiches
 List of buns
 Vada pav

References 

Sandwiches
Pakistani cuisine
Pakistani fast food
Kebab
Kebabs
Cuisine of Karachi